The Miller JM-2 was an American Formula One Air Racing homebuilt aircraft that was designed by Jim W Miller and produced by JW Miller Aviation of Marble Falls, Texas. When it was available the aircraft was supplied in the form of plans for amateur construction.

Design and development
The JM-2 features a cantilever mid-wing, a single-seat enclosed open cockpit under a bubble canopy, tricycle landing gear with fixed main wheels and a retractable nose wheel, and a single engine in pusher configuration, mounted within a fan shroud, with the spinner acting as the aircraft's tailcone. The fan shroud structure provides a place to mount the rudders and the tailplane is mounted high in T-tail configuration as an extension of the shroud. There is a small canard surface mounted on the nose.

The aircraft is of mixed construction, with the fuselage made from four fiberglass panels and the  span wing covered in fiberglass and resin-reinforced honeycomb material. As required by the Formula One rules, the engine used was a  Continental O-200B powerplant, the "B" being the pusher-configured version of the engine.

The JM-2 was further developed into the one-of-a-kind racing aircraft, the Miller-Bohannon JM-2 Pushy Galore.

Operational history
By October 2013 three examples had been registered in the United States with the Federal Aviation Administration including the sole Miller-Bohannon JM-2 Pushy Galore. None of the aircraft remains registered.

One of the two stock JM-2s built was destroyed while racing in the Reno Air Races at Reno, Nevada on 15 September 1989, when it flew through a dust devil and broke up in flight, killing the pilot.

Specifications (JM-2)

References

External links
Photo of the stock JM-2 that later crashed at Reno

JM-2
1970s United States sport aircraft
Single-engined pusher aircraft
Mid-wing aircraft
Homebuilt aircraft